The Bachelor of Theology degree (BTh, ThB, or BTheol) is a three- to five-year undergraduate degree or graduate degree in theological disciplines and is typically (but not exclusively) pursued by those seeking ordination for ministry in a church, denomination, or parachurch organization.  Candidates for this degree typically must complete course work in Greek and(or) Hebrew, as well as systematic theology, biblical theology, ethics, homiletics, hermeneutics, counseling and Christian ministry. The Bachelor of Theology may include a thesis component and may consist of an additional year beyond the coursework requirements for the degrees of Bachelor of Religious Education and Bachelor of Arts. In some denominations, such as the Church of England or the Presbyterian Church of America, it is considered sufficient qualification for formal ordination.

UK & Europe 
In the United Kingdom and other European nations, the Bachelor of Theology is a three to five year degree for students pursuing ordination.

BTh is currently offered at:
 The University of Oxford as a graduate degree offered at two colleges
 The University of Cambridge as Bachelor of Theology for Ministry offered at five colleges 
 Edinburgh Theological Seminary validated by the University of Glasgow
 University of Aberdeen as a distance learning degree
 South West Baptist College
 St Patrick's College, Maynooth as a three-year, Level 8 degree

United States 
Within the United States, the Bachelor of Theology (or Bachelor of Divinity) is generally identical in coursework and requirements to the Master of Divinity.  A Bachelor of Theology, however, does not academically amount to MDiv equivalence since it is an undergraduate degree. More common than the Bachelor of Theology in the US are dual-degree programs where one may earn an undergraduate degree in Bible and(or) theology and a Master of Divinity simultaneously.

Notable BTh graduates 
 Rev. Canon Prof. Susan Gillingham

See also 
Associate of Theology
Bachelor of Divinity
Bible College
Ordination
Licentiate in Theology
Seminary

References

Theology
Religious degrees